Daniel Barrish (born 2000) is a South African chess player who holds the title of FIDE Master (FM, 2013).

Career
In 2012, aged 11, Barrish drew with Garry Kasparov in a simultaneous event. He earned the title of FIDE Master in 2013, and in 2019 earned his first IM norm in Greece, and won the South African Chess Championship in  2019 with a score of 7.5/11, half a point ahead of Grandmaster Kenny Solomon.

Barrish is ranked 4th amongst active South African players as of August 2022.

He played in the Chess World Cup 2021 after qualifying via the South African zonal spot, where he was defeated by Aryan Tari in the first round.

He represented South Africa in the 2022 Chess Olympiad on board three, scoring 5/9.

References

External links
 

Daniel Barrish chess games at 365Chess.com

South African chess players
Living people
2000 births
Chess FIDE Masters